Herbs Production & Processing Co. Ltd. (abbr. HPPCL)()is a Government of Nepal undertaking herbal production company.

History 
The company was established in 1981 under the supervision of government of Nepal. It is the first Nepali company to harvest the countries MAPs(Medicinal and Aromatic Plants) and produce medicinal extract and essential oil for pharmaceutical, food, beauty and wellness industry.  Dr. Sindu Prasad Dhungana is the current chairperson of the company. 

The headquarter of the company is in Kathmandu. It owns 500 Bighas of land in Bara, 70 hectors in Belbari, 25 hector in Sunsari and 4.5 hector in Kailali districts to grow the medicinal herbs. In Kanchanpur it owns 20 Ropanis land. A branch office was established in Jajarkot (Karnali district) in 2078 BS.

Products 
Sancho: It is one of the main product with annual production totalling to 3.3 million units. It is essentially Zanthoxylum oil made from a blend of various Himalayan essential herb oils and used for curing minor aches and cold. It consists of eucalyptus, kapoor, Tusli, Timoor .  
 Balm
 Himalayan massage oil
 Silajit

See also 

 Herbal medicine

References 

Medical and health organisations based in Nepal
Companies established in 1981
Herbalism
Government-owned companies of Nepal
1981 establishments in Nepal

External links 
 Official website